Tayla Stahl (born 6 January 1995) is a retired Australian rules footballer who played for the Richmond Football Club in the AFL Women's (AFLW). Prior to signing with Richmond, Stahl was sentenced with a two year suspended sentence for her part in a failed bank robbery. Stahl signed with Richmond during the first period of the 2019 expansion club signing period in May. She made her debut against  at Ikon Park in the opening round of the 2020 season. In June 2022, Stahl retired due to health reasons.

Statistics
Statistics are correct to the end of the 2022 season.

|- style="background-color: #eaeaea"
! scope="row" style="text-align:center" | 2020
|style="text-align:center;"|
| 24 || 4 || 1 || 1 || 30 || 2 || 32 || 10 || 15 || 0.3 || 0.3 || 7.5 || 0.5 || 8.0 || 2.5 || 3.8
|-
| 2021 ||  
| 24 || 9 || 7 || 2 || 43 || 20 || 63 || 11 || 16 ||0.8 || 0.2 || 4.8 || 2.2 || 7.0 || 1.2 || 1.8 
|-
| 2022 || 
| 24 || 8 || 5 || 2 || 20 || 13 || 33 || 8 || 12 || 0.6 || 0.3 || 2.5 || 1.6 || 4.1 || 1.0 || 1.5
|-
|- class="sortbottom"
! colspan=3| Career
! 21
! 13
! 5
! 93
! 35
! 128
! 29
! 43
! 0.6
! 0.2
! 4.4
! 1.7
! 6.1
! 1.4
! 2.0
|}

References

External links

1995 births
Living people
Richmond Football Club (AFLW) players
Australian rules footballers from Victoria (Australia)